Kyatuk or Aghgadik is a village that is, de facto, in the Askeran Province of the breakaway Republic of Artsakh; de jure, it is in the Khojaly District of Azerbaijan, in the disputed region of Nagorno-Karabakh. The village has an ethnic Armenian-majority population, and also had an Armenian majority in 1989.

History 
During the Soviet period, the village was part of the Askeran District of the Nagorno-Karabakh Autonomous Oblast.

Economy and culture 
The village is part of the community of Askeran.

Demographics 
The village had 8 inhabitants in 2005, and 6 inhabitants in 2015.

Notable people 
 Mikael Aramyants (1843-1923) – Armenian oil magnate
 Mikayel Varandian (1870-1934) – Armenian revolutionary and historian

References

External links 
 

Populated places in Askeran Province
Populated places in Khojaly District